Miss Supranational is an annual international female beauty pageant, started in 2009, and with most contests held in Poland and a parallel male contest, Mister Supranational, began in 2016, also in Poland.

The current owners of Miss and Mister Supranational are World Beauty Association S.A. and Nowa Scena with president is its founder Gerhard Parzutka Von Lipinsky as president of the production company Nowa Scena.

The current pageant title holders are Lalela Mswane of South Africa and Luis Daniel Gálvez of Cuba,  who were elected respectively on July 15 and 16 in Małopolska, Poland.

Miss Supranational 

Miss Supranational is managed by the World Beauty Association S.A., which was founded in 2009 in Panama. The first World Beauty Association president was Tryny Marcela Yandar Lobón, with Gerhard Parzutka von Lipinski from Poland as executive producer, and president of the production company Nowa Scena.

Parzutka von Lipinski has been referred to as the President of Miss Supranational since at least 2017.

The Miss Supranational contests began in 2009 and were held in Poland except 2013 which was in Minsk, Belarus, and 2016, which was co-hosted with Poprad, Slovakia. Mister Supranational also began in 2016, in Krynica-Zdrój, Poland.

The World Beauty Association, based in Hong Kong, organized a rival Miss Supranational 2014 pageant in India which could not be held in person due to responses to the West African Ebola virus epidemic. It crowned one candidate, Jennifer Poleo of Venezuela, remotely, and without runners-up, and did not hold any subsequent contests.

The Miss and Mister Supranational 2020 contests were postponed to 2021 due to the COVID-19 pandemic, with Anntonia Porsild from Thailand and Nate Crnkovich from the United States to retain their respective titles until then. 2020 was the first year that the Miss and Mister Supranational contests were not held since their inception.

Crowns of Miss Supranational 

 White and Blue Crown (2009–2021) – This crown was designed by the renowned jeweler and crown maker, George Wittels from Venezuela. It is made on a fine silver base bordered by numerous white crystals, diamonds and soft blue sapphires, at an approximate cost of US$300,000 make it a piece of great value. Miss Supranational's crown from its first edition until today. In today it is still the same design, however, over the years it has undergone several modifications but without losing its original design. Among the most significant characteristics is its symmetrical shape finely framed at the focal and central point of the piece, a sapphire flower crowned, by a white diamond. The White and Blue crown will cease its use in 2022 and will last be worn by Chanique Rabe from Namibia, who won in 2021.
The Supranational Crown (2022–present) – This crown was designed  by well-known Mexican jeweler and crown maker Ricardo Patraca. The second-ever  Miss Supranational crown since its infamous first Blue and White crown from 2009, was unveiled during the 13th Miss Supranational competition. The crown was inspired by this beauty contest’s slogan: Inspirational – Aspirational. It represents the union and the friendship that never ends the bonds. The lines go up from the bottom of the crown towards the upper part, symbolizing the inspirational part of Miss Supranational. The side of the crown has a motif representing the ribbons that are usually used to symbolize different social causes. The blue stones represent the peace and the family that usually characterizes the Supra family.

Editions 
The following is a list of Miss Supranational pageant edition and information.

Recent titleholders

Gallery of winners

Notes

Mister Supranational 

In 2016, the Polish businessman, producer, and international director of Miss Supranational Gerardo Von Lipinsky, founded the international male beauty contest, Mister Supranational, together with the Panamanian businesswoman Marcela Lobón, creator of WBA (World Beauty Association). The first edition of the contest was held on December 2, 2016 at the Municipal Sports and Recreation Center (MOSIR), in the city of Krynica-Zdrój, Poland, with the participation of 36 candidates from various countries around the world, with Diego Garcy from Mexico, the first winner of the contest.

Approximately 80 countries have participated in the contest, making it one of the most important male beauty pageants in the world.

Editions 
The following is a list of Mister Supranational pageant edition and information.

Titleholders

Country/Territory by number of wins

Gallery of winners

Notes

Miss and Mister Supranational Organization

The following is a list of all Miss and Mister Supranational Organization titleholders from the founding of each pageant until now.

Supra  Star Search 
During a Covid-19 pandemic in 2020, Supra Star Search was introduced on 19 October 2020 as a virtual competition for men and women who want to compete for the Miss or Mister Supranational titles in countries with no national organizations.

Titleholders 
{|
| valign="top" width="10%" |

Other representatives